Odd Number (Spanish: La cifra impar) is a 1962 Argentine mystery film directed by Manuel Antín and starring Lautaro Murúa, María Rosa Gallo and Sergio Renán.

Cast
 Lautaro Murúa 
 María Rosa Gallo 
 Sergio Renán
 Milagros de la Vega 
 Maurice Jouvet 
 José María Fra

References

Bibliography 
 Ronald Schwartz. Latin American Films, 1932-1994: A Critical Filmography. McFarland, 2005.

External links 
 

1962 films
1960s mystery films
Argentine mystery films
1960s Spanish-language films
Films directed by Manuel Antín
Films based on works by Julio Cortázar
Films based on short fiction
1960s Argentine films